The 1983 Freiburg Open was a tennis tournament played on outdoor clay courts in Freiburg, West Germany that was part of the 1983 Virginia Slims World Championship Series. The tournament was held from 11 July through 17 July 1983. Catherine Tanvier won the singles title.

Finals

Singles
 Catherine Tanvier defeated  Laura Gildemeister 6–4, 7–5
 It was Tanvier's 1st title of the year and the 3rd of her career.

Doubles
 Bettina Bunge /  Eva Pfaff defeated  Ivanna Madruga-Osses /  Emilse Raponi 6–1, 6–2
 It was Bunge's 3rd title of the year and the 5th of her career. It was Pfaff's 2nd title of the year and the 5th of her career.

Freiburg Open
Freiburg Open